Geet Gaata Chal is a Hindi film released in 1975. Produced by Tarachand Barjatya for Rajshri Productions, the film is directed by Hiren Nag. The film stars  Sachin, Sarika, Madan Puri, Padma Khanna and Leela Mishra. The songs written and composed by Ravindra Jain. The movie is a remake of 1965 Bengali movie Atithi.

Cast 
 Sachin as Shyam
 Sarika as Radha
 Khyati as Meera
 Urmila Bhatt as Ganga
 Madan Puri as Sohan Singh
 Padma Khanna as Champa
 Manher Desai as Durga babu
 Leela Mishra as Buaji
 Dhumal as Champa's dance troupe owner

Plot 
Durga Babu, and his wife, Ganga, comes across Shyam, an orphan, who sings and dances on special occasions, and decide to take him home. Shyam meets with their daughter, Radha, and she slowly falls in love with him, but he thinks that she just wants to be friends. In his eyes, Shyam wants to be a free person, not tied down to anyone or anything, and would like to spend the rest of his life wandering, singing, and dancing. When he discovers that the family intend to get him married, he likens his plight to that of a caged bird, and flees, breaking Radha's heart. Will Shyam ever return? What impact will this have on the family?

Soundtrack

References

External links 
 
 Rajshri Productions
 saregama music

1975 films
1970s Hindi-language films
Films scored by Ravindra Jain
Rajshri Productions films
Films based on works by Rabindranath Tagore
Hindi remakes of Bengali films
Films directed by Hiren Nag